Scream of the Mourning Star is the debut album by Polish death metal band Lost Soul. It was released on November 20, 2000.

Track listing

Personnel
Lost Soul
 Jacek Grecki – vocals, lead guitar
 Piotr Ostrowski – guitar
 Krzysztof Artur Zagórowicz – bass
 Adam Sierżęga – drums

Production
 Marcin Bors – engineering
 Bartek Straburzyński – engineering
 Wiesław Fatyga – photography
 GRAAL – cover design, layout

References

2000 debut albums
Lost Soul (band) albums
Metal Mind Productions albums
Relapse Records albums